Life Is Yours is the seventh studio album by British rock band Foals, released on 17 June 2022 via Warner/Transgressive/ADA. The album was preceded by five singles; "Wake Me Up", "2am", "Looking High", "2001" and "Crest of the Wave".

Life Is Yours is the group's first album as a trio, following the departures of keyboardist Edwin Congreave in 2021 and bassist Walter Gervers in 2018. The album is also notable as the group's first time collaborating with multiple producers for a release, which includes John Hill, Dan Carey, A. K. Paul and Miles James.

In December 2022, frontman Yannis Philippakis spoke to NME about a remix of the album by Dan Carey called Life Is Dub. Philippakis stated "I think he just loaded the album up on some decks, took some mushrooms and took the album into space!". The remix will be released on Record Store Day 2023.

Promotion 
On 27 October 2021, the band teased a promotional clip of an iPhone snooze alarm, revealing the release date of the album's first single, "Wake Me Up" to be released 4 November 2021.

On 10 February 2022, Foals released "2am" and announced the name of their seventh album as Life Is Yours, and later announced the album release date.

On 1 April 2022, the band released the third single from the album, "Looking High".

On 19 May 2022, Foals released the single "2001".
Three days before Life Is Yours was released, the band released the fifth and final single from the album, "Crest of the Wave"

Tour 

In April 2022, Foals embarked on their Life Is Yours Tour in support of the album. Goat Girl, Shame, Yard Act, and Egyptian Blue supported the band on select UK dates.

Critical reception 
Life Is Yours has an average rating of 74 out of 100 on review aggregator website Metacritic and an AnyDecentMusic? score of 7.5 out of 10. Andrew Trendell of NME praised the album's production, and wrote the lead single "Wake Me Up" "delivers that same spirit like a spicy tequila shot – all funk, fury and fire-breathing defiance as an ode to getting away and losing your shit". Phil Mongredien of The Guardian stated that the album's use of keyboards of synths was a "bold move, and probably a smart one", whilst criticising the second half of the album, describing "Crest of the Wave" as an "ersatz Everything Everything". Lee Campbell of Rolling Stone described the feel of the album as "certainly more joyous and celebratory [than Everything Not Saved Will Be Lost – Part 2]".

Track listing

Notes
  indicates an additional producer
  indicates a co-producer

Personnel
Foals
 Yannis Philippakis – vocals, guitar, bass
 Jack Bevan – drums, percussion
 Jimmy Smith – guitar, keyboards

Additional musicians
 Jack Freeman – backing vocals 
 Kit Monteith – backing vocals 
 A. K. Paul – bass, additional keyboards 

Technical

 Matt Colton – mastering 
 Randy Merrill – mastering 
 Manny Marroquin – mixing 
 Mark "Spike" Stent – mixing 
 Chris Laws – mixing 
 Chris Galland – mix engineering 
 Rob Cohen – engineering
 Christoph Skirl – engineering
 Oli Middleton – engineering
 Pete Hutchings – engineering
 Alexis Smith – engineering 
 Mark Rankin – additional engineering 
 James Keeley – additional engineering 
 Jeremie Inhaber – mixing assistance 
 Robin Florent – mixing assistance 
 Scott Desmarais – mixing assistance 
 Charlie Holmes – mixing assistance 
 Kieran Beardmore – mixing assistance 
 Matt Wolach – mixing assistance

Charts

References

2022 albums
Foals (band) albums
Warner Records albums